Marcos Antônio Costa Ferreira de Macedo (born 9 September 1990 in Natal) is a Brazilian competitive swimmer. is a Brazilian professional swimmer. He currently competes for the Fiat/Minas team. Marcos won the 4 × 100 m medley relay in the 2014 World Swimming Championship (short course).

International career

2008–12

He won the bronze medal in the 4×100-metre freestyle at the 2008 FINA Youth World Swimming Championships in Monterrey.

At the 2011 World Aquatics Championships in Shanghai, China, Macedo finished 9th in the 4×100-metre freestyle. At the 2011 Summer Universiade in Shenzhen, China, he got a silver medal in the 4×100-metre freestyle relay.

2013–16
Macedo was part of the Brazilian delegation that finished in the first place the medal chart of the World Swimming Championship (short course) in Doha, with 7 golds, 1 silver and two bronzes (10 medals total). Marcos won the gold medal in the 4 × 100 m relay, in the team also composed by César Cielo, Guilherme Guido, and Felipe França Silva. He swam the butterfly course in 49.63, with team's total time of 3:21.14. He also qualified for the final on the men's 100 metre butterfly, and finished in 8th, 50.47.

2016 Summer Olympics

At the 2016 Summer Olympics, Macedo finished 34th in the Men's 100 metre butterfly.

References

External links 
 

1990 births
Living people
People from Natal, Rio Grande do Norte
Brazilian male butterfly swimmers
Brazilian male freestyle swimmers
Medalists at the FINA World Swimming Championships (25 m)
Swimmers at the 2016 Summer Olympics
Olympic swimmers of Brazil
Universiade medalists in swimming
Universiade silver medalists for Brazil
Medalists at the 2011 Summer Universiade
Sportspeople from Rio Grande do Norte
21st-century Brazilian people